The Williamstown Theatre Festival is a resident summer theater on the campus of Williams College in Williamstown, Massachusetts. It was founded in 1954 by Williams College news director Ralph Renzi and drama program chairman David C. Bryant. It was awarded a Tony Award in 2002 and the Massachusetts Cultural Council Commonwealth Award in 2011.

History

Inception 
The Williamstown Theatre Festival was conceived as a way to use the Adams Memorial Theatre on Williams College campus for a resident theatre company. Marcia Henderson, a Theatre World winner and Williamstown native, performed in the first play of the festival. Other notable actors have since participated in the festival, including Sigourney Weaver, Gwyneth Paltrow, Christopher Walken, Nathan Lane, Richard Chamberlain, Kate Burton, Olympia Dukakis, Paul Giamatti, Bradley Cooper, Calista Flockhart, Matthew Broderick, Jesse Tyler Ferguson, and Uma Thurman.

Nikos Psacharopoulus 
Nikos Psacharopoulos, a professor at Yale Drama School and a co-founder, became the executive artistic director and guided the company for over thirty years. Psacharopoulos made certain WTF would not be a typical summer stock theater by focusing on such international playwrights as Chekhov, George Bernard Shaw, Jean Anouilh, Tennessee Williams, Bertholt Brecht, and Tom Stoppard . He mentored his associates and assistant directors, such as Tom Brennan, Arvin Brown, Keith Fowler,  Peter H. Hunt, Paul Weidner, and Austin Pendleton.  He attracted well-known actors including E.G. Marshall, Frank Langella, Rosemary Harris, Blythe Danner, and Colleen Dewhurst. Christopher Reeve, once a WTF apprentice and later a frequently-featured actor at the festival, told an interviewer: "By staying here thirty years, Nikos [did] what they couldn't do in Brooklyn or Washington or at Lincoln Center. He has managed to achieve a national theater."

Recent (1989 - present) 
Psacharopoulos died in 1989. Following a 35th season run by a troika of Peter H. Hunt, Austin Pendleton and George Morfogen, In 1990, Hunt was named Artistic Director for the 36th season. In 1996, long-time WTF stage manager Michael Ritchie became the head of the festival, and during his eight years at the helm, nearly two dozen productions transferred to Broadway, Off-Broadway and regional theaters across the country. Ritchie was succeeded in 2005 by Roger Rees. Former WTF resident director Nicholas Martin served as Artistic Director from 2008-2010. Former Associate Producer Jenny Gersten served as Artistic Director from 2011-2014. Mandy Greenfield served as Artistic Director from 2014-2021. Following Greenfield's resignation, Greenfield's predecessor Jenny Gersten was named Interim Artistic Director.
  
In 2002, the American Theater Wing awarded WTF America's highest theatrical honor, the Antoinette Perry Award for Excellence in Theater, the "Tony", as an especially distinguished regional theater. In 2005, the festival held its inaugural season in the '62 center for Theater and Dance, which replaced the Adams Memorial Theatre.

The festival transferred several successful shows to Broadway, including One Mo' Time, Hedda Gabler, The Man Who Had All the Luck, The Bridges of Madison County, and The Elephant Man.

Throughout its over four decades in existence, many celebrated American artists—designers, composers, directors, choreographers as well as stage and screen actors—have worked as apprentices or company members at Williamstown.

References

External links

 
 
 Williamstown Theatre Festival collection at Williams College Archives & Special Collections 

1954 establishments in Massachusetts
Theatre companies in Massachusetts
Theatre festivals in the United States
Tony Award winners
Regional theatre in the United States
University and college theatres in the United States
Williams College
Williamstown, Massachusetts